Kasrawad Assembly constituency is one of the 230 Vidhan Sabha (Legislative Assembly) constituencies of Madhya Pradesh state in central India.

It is part of Khargone District.

Members of Legislative Assembly

Election results

2013 results

See also
 Kasrawad

References

Assembly constituencies of Madhya Pradesh